Sun Glacier (old Greenlandic spelling: Iterdlagssûp Qíngua), is a glacier in northwestern Greenland. Administratively it belongs to the Avannaata municipality.

This glacier was named by Robert Peary. It was the subject of paintings by Frank Wilbert Stokes at the end of the 19th century. In a 1892 painting Stokes described the terminus of the glacier:

Geography 
The Sun Glacier discharges from the Greenland Ice Sheet at the head of the MacCormick Fjord.

The glacier flows roughly from NNE to SSW.

See also
List of glaciers in Greenland
Inglefield Fjord

References

External links
Identifying Spatial Variability in Greenland's Outlet Glacier Response to Ocean Heat

Glaciers of Greenland